Segun Dangote (born May 4, 1984, as Ajayi John Olusegun) was the Assistant host/Sidekick on The Teju Babyface Show. up until November 2014. He currently plays the lead role of 'Bade Williams' in fast rising comedy web series #THEBIGIDEA. He is a Master of Ceremonies, Comedian, TV personality, Brand Strategist, Actor and Social commentator.

Education 
He attended Effortswill Nursery and Primary School, Lagos, Mercy Day Junior High School, Lagos and Beautiful Gate Secondary School, Lagos where he obtained his Primary, Junior and Senior Secondary School certificates respectively. In 2008, he graduated from Yaba College of Technology having studied Computer Science after which he enrolled at the Orange Academy (School of Branding and Advertising), Maryland, Lagos for a certificate course in Integrated Branding Experience. He later attended the Vega School of Brand Leadership, Cape Town, South Africa where he obtained a BA (Hons) in Brand Strategy and Communications. He is also an Alumnus of the Daystar Leadership Academy.

Career 
Segun's first shot at entertainment was in 2005 in church. He had attended a midweek service in church when he saw a comedian performing on stage just before the Pastor mounted the pulpit to deliver his sermon. It was during this performance that it occurred to him he could actually do same if he put his heart to it. After the service that night, he approached one of the Pastors and asked how he could also get to perform whereupon he was told he needed to prove his ability to be on the big stage by mastering the art of performing on the smaller stages first so he began to perform at small gatherings in church – House fellowship meetings, membership school graduations, church departmental awards/dinners, singles’ events, campus fellowships and so on. He would also follow his Pastor then to speaking engagements at other churches/gatherings and just before his Pastor mounted the pulpit, he would perform for 3 - 5mins. He had done all these for several months until both the Pastor and himself were confident enough that he was ready for the church stage on a major midweek service day. He finally got a nod by the church's Pastorate to perform on a fixed date – His dream had come to pass. He was going to do this after which he would move on to other things as he never thought he would do it for a living. On the set date, he performed so well that he got the attention of Popular Stand Up Comedian and Actor, Teju Babyface who was in the audience that night. Their meeting afterwards saw Teju taking him on as a protégé with an encouragement to take Comedy up as a professional career. 
In August 2006 (Just about a year after his first major performance on stage in church) Segun organised his first Stand Up comedy show tagged “Sometime In August”, featuring comedians, musicians, dancers and a Motivational Speaker. The idea was to infuse Motivational Speaking into comedy shows so audience would have something inspiring to leave with after the fun and laughter. It held at a small School Hall in Oregun, Lagos and had 158 people in attendance. In 2007, he held the 2nd edition of “Sometime In August” at the Events Centre, Ikeja. This time there were over 350 people in attendance. The 3rd edition was held the next year in 2008 and this time, at the MUSON Centre, Lagos with the hall filled to capacity. He has since distinguished himself amongst colleagues of his in the industry as a warm, calm, classy and refined performer with a niche set of audience. He has since metamorphosed into a full-fledged Master Compere cum TV Presenter. Of the plethora of events he has been privileged to perform, he reveals being MC at the Bridge Clinic's Celebration of 1859 babies event in Lagos has been most exhilarating for him. 
In 2010, his thirst for more knowledge as well as his quest to further differentiate his personal brand saw him traveling to Cape Town, South Africa to study Branding. He majored in Strategy and Communication and upon graduation, he began working with JWT Advertising, Cape Town as a Junior Strategist. Months later, he got the call to go back to Nigeria to join the Class Act Entertainment team working on the Teju Babyface Show. He was until his resignation at Class Act Entertainment, the Chief Operating Officer overseeing all administrative, creative, marketing and branding concerns of the company. He is currently the chief executive officer of The Humotivation Company Ltd; a Strategy and Media/Entertainment company.

References

External links
 The Teju Babyface Show

1984 births
Living people
Yaba College of Technology alumni
Nigerian male film actors
Nigerian television talk show hosts
Nigerian television producers
Nigerian television personalities
Nigerian stand-up comedians
Nigerian media executives
Nigerian male television actors
Nigerian male comedians
21st-century Nigerian male actors
Nigerian television presenters
Nigerian entertainment industry businesspeople